"Ohh! Paradise Taste!!" is a song by Japanese singer-songwriter Rina Aiuchi. It was released on 26 July 2000 through Giza Studio, as the third single from her debut album Be Happy. The song reached number twenty-three in Japan and has sold over 42,550 copies nationwide. The song served as the commercial song to the Japanese cup noodle brand, Check It Out!.

Commercial performance
"Ohh! Paradise Taste!!" has sold over 42,550 copies in Japan and peaked at number twenty-three on the Oricon weekly singles chart, which long had been Aiuchi's worst-charting single until her 2010 single "Hanabi" peaked at number twenty-eight.

Track listing

Charts

Certification and sales

|-
! scope="row"| Japan (RIAJ)
| 
| 42,550
|-
|}

Release history

References

2000 singles
2000 songs
J-pop songs
Songs written by Aika Ohno
Song recordings produced by Daiko Nagato
Songs written by Rina Aiuchi